Mount Olivet may refer to any of the following:

Mount of Olives in East Jerusalem
Mount Olivet Cemetery, any of several throughout North America
Mount Olivet, Kentucky, United States
Mount Olivet, Marshall County, West Virginia
Mount Olivet, Preston County, West Virginia
Mount Olivet, Haldimand County, Ontario, Canada

See also
 Mountolive